Jorge Luis Díaz Gutiérrez (born 28 June 1989) is a Uruguayan professional footballer who plays as a winger for Greek Super League club Panetolikos, for which he is captain.

Career
Born in Montevideo, Díaz moved to Spain at early age and graduated from FC Cambrils's youth ranks, making his senior debuts in the 2007–08 campaign. In the 2009 summer he joined CF Amposta in Tercera División.

Cruz joined CF Reddis, CF Reus Deportiu's farm team in 2010. He was promoted to the main squad in January of the following year, appearing regularly and being promoted to Segunda División B with the Catalans at the end of the season. On 1 February 2012 he moved to RCD Espanyol, being assigned to the reserves also in the fourth level.

Díaz appeared rarely for the Pericos during his one-year spell, and moved to Albacete Balompié on 25 January 2013. With the latter he achieved promotion to Segunda División, scoring six goals in 39 matches.

On 24 August 2014 Díaz played his first match as a professional, starting in a 2–3 home loss against AD Alcorcón. He scored his first goal six days later, in a 1–1 away draw against CD Tenerife.

On 6 July 2015, Díaz signed a three-year deal with fellow league team Real Zaragoza. On 1 February of the following year, however, he was loaned to CD Numancia in the same division.

On 4 July 2016, Díaz returned to his former club Reus, newly promoted to the second tier, in a one-year loan deal. Roughly one year later, he signed a two-year contract with Greek club Panetolikos.

Career statistics

References

External links

1989 births
Living people
Footballers from Montevideo
Uruguayan footballers
Association football wingers
Segunda División players
Segunda División B players
Tercera División players
Super League Greece players
CF Reus Deportiu B players
CF Reus Deportiu players
RCD Espanyol B footballers
Albacete Balompié players
Real Zaragoza players
CD Numancia players
Panetolikos F.C. players
Uruguayan expatriate footballers
Uruguayan expatriate sportspeople in Greece
Expatriate footballers in Greece